Pino Hachado Pass is a mountain pass through the Andes, joining Chile and Argentina. It is one of the principal passes of the southern Andes, connecting Argentina's route RN-242 and Chile's Route 181-CH.

Transit must pass through Las Raíces Tunnel, on the Chilean side.   At its highest peak, Pino Hachado Pass is 1884 meters high. The climate is cold and dry, with summer temperatures recorded at 25 °C/77 °F, and winter temperatures recorded at -15 °C/5 °F.  The closest inhabited locations are Las Lajas in Argentina, with approximately 5,000 inhabitants, and Liucura in Chile, with approximately 700 inhabitants.  Both Las Lajas and Liucura communities have organized a project called El Corredor de los Niños (The Children's Corridor).  This program is focused on uniting school children from both communities and teaching them the value of protecting the route, both environmentally and in the control of transports.  In order to pass Pino Hachado, travelers must stop at both the Chilean and Argentinian customs and immigration services.

References

Mountain passes of Chile
Mountain passes of Argentina
Mountain passes of the Andes
Argentina–Chile border crossings
Landforms of Araucanía Region
Landforms of Neuquén Province
Transport in La Araucanía Region